Rolf Terje Klungland (born 6 July 1963 in Flekkefjord) is a Norwegian politician for the Labour Party.

He was elected to the Norwegian Parliament from Vest-Agder in 1993, and has been re-elected on two occasions. He served as a deputy representative during the term 1997–2001.

On the local level Klungland was a member of Vest-Agder county council from 1991 to 1995. He chairs the Kvinesdal party chapter since 1997.

Outside politics he spent many years as a factory worker, but in 1999 became "personnel consultant" in Sirdal municipality. He has been active in the Norwegian Confederation of Trade Unions and the European Movement.

References

1963 births
Living people
Members of the Storting
Vest-Agder politicians
Labour Party (Norway) politicians
21st-century Norwegian politicians
20th-century Norwegian politicians
People from Flekkefjord